Frozen: A Suite of Winter Songs is the debut studio album of Ivoux, released on  March 10, 1998, by Federation Records COP Int'l. The recording sessions for the were first pressed to cassette in December 1996 by founding members Maria Azevedo and Evan Sornstein.

Reception
Last Sigh called Frozen: A Suite of Winter Songs a "sensitive and deeply moving composition" that's "wonderfully soft and elegant, with a unique flare" Sonic Boom called the album "the most Gothic release produced by this trio, albeit it shares more in common with the Darkwave and Ethereal scenes than true Gothic music due to its lack of guitars."

Track listing

Personnel
Adapted from the Frozen: A Suite of Winter Songs liner notes.

Ivoux
 Maria Azevedo – lead vocals, production, recording
 Shawn Brice – instruments, production, recording
 Evan Sornstein (Curium Design) – instruments, production, recording, design

Additional performers
 Melanie Olstad – spoken word (6)

Production and design
 Stefan Noltemeyer – mastering

Release history

References

External links 
 

1998 debut albums
COP International albums